Pierre Curie (15 May 1859 – 19 April 1906) was a French physicist, a pioneer in crystallography, magnetism, piezoelectricity, and radioactivity. In 1903, he received the Nobel Prize in Physics with his wife, Marie Skłodowska–Curie, and Henri Becquerel, "in recognition of the extraordinary services they have rendered by their joint researches on the radiation phenomena discovered by Professor Henri Becquerel". With their win, the Curies became the first ever married couple to win the Nobel Prize, launching the Curie family legacy of five Nobel Prizes.

Early life 
Born in Paris on 15 May 1859, Pierre Curie was the son of Eugène Curie (1827–1910), a doctor of French Catholic origin from Alsace, and Sophie-Claire Curie (née Depouilly; 1832–1897). He was educated by his father and in his early teens showed a strong aptitude for mathematics and geometry. When he was 16, he earned his Bachelor of Science in mathematics. By the age of 18, he earned his license, the equivalent of a U.S. master's degree, in physical sciences from the Faculty of Sciences at the Sorbonne, also known as the University of Paris. He did not proceed immediately to a doctorate due to lack of money. Instead, he worked as a laboratory instructor. When Pierre Curie was preparing for his Bachelor of Science degree, he worked in the laboratory of Jean-Gustave Bourbouze in the Faculty of Science. In 1895, he went on to receive his doctorate at the University of Paris. The submission material for his doctorate consisted of his research over magnetism. After obtaining his doctorate, he became professor of physics and in 1900, he became professor in the faculty of sciences.

In 1880, Pierre and his older brother Paul-Jacques (1856–1941) demonstrated that an electric potential was generated when crystals were compressed, i.e. piezoelectricity. To aid this work they invented the piezoelectric quartz electrometer. The following year they demonstrated the reverse effect: that crystals could be made to deform when subject to an electric field.<ref
name="Brothers" /> Almost all digital electronic circuits now rely on this in the form of crystal oscillators. In subsequent work on magnetism Pierre Curie defined the Curie scale. This work also involved delicate equipment – balances, electrometers, etc.

Pierre Curie was introduced to Maria Skłodowska by their friend, physicist Józef Wierusz-Kowalski. Curie took her into his laboratory as his student. His admiration for her grew when he realized that she would not inhibit his research. He began to regard Skłodowska as his muse. She refused his initial proposal, but finally agreed to marry him on 26 July 1895.

The Curies had a happy, affectionate marriage, and they were known for their devotion to each other.

Research 

Before his famous doctoral studies on magnetism, he designed and perfected an extremely sensitive torsion balance for measuring magnetic coefficients. Variations on this equipment were commonly used by future workers in that area. Pierre Curie studied ferromagnetism, paramagnetism, and diamagnetism for his doctoral thesis, and discovered the effect of temperature on paramagnetism which is now known as Curie's law. The material constant in Curie's law is known as the Curie constant. He also discovered that ferromagnetic substances exhibited a critical temperature transition, above which the substances lost their ferromagnetic behavior. This is now known as the Curie temperature. The Curie temperature is used to study plate tectonics, treat hypothermia, measure caffeine, and to understand extraterrestrial magnetic fields. The Curie is a unit of measurement (3.7 × 1010 decays per second or 37 gigabecquerels) used to describe the intensity of a sample of radioactive material and was named after Marie and Pierre Curie by the Radiology Congress in 1910.

Pierre Curie formulated what is now known as the Curie Dissymmetry Principle: a physical effect cannot have a dissymmetry absent from its efficient cause. For example, a random mixture of sand in zero gravity has no dissymmetry (it is isotropic). Introduce a gravitational field, and there is a dissymmetry because of the direction of the field. Then the sand grains can 'self-sort' with the density increasing with depth. But this new arrangement, with the directional arrangement of sand grains, actually reflects the dissymmetry of the gravitational field that causes the separation.

Curie worked with his wife in isolating polonium and radium. They were the first to use the term "radioactivity", and were pioneers in its study. Their work, including Marie Curie's celebrated doctoral work, made use of a sensitive piezoelectric electrometer constructed by Pierre and his brother Jacques Curie. Pierre Curie's 26 December 1898 publication with his wife and M. G. Bémont for their discovery of radium and polonium was honored by a Citation for Chemical Breakthrough Award from the Division of History of Chemistry of the American Chemical Society presented to the ESPCI ParisTech (officially the École supérieure de physique et de Chimie industrielles de la Ville de Paris) in 2015. In 1903, to honor the Curies' work, the Royal Society of London invited Pierre to present their research. Marie Curie was not permitted to give the lecture so Lord Kelvin sat beside her while Pierre spoke on their research. After this, Lord Kelvin held a luncheon for Pierre. While in London, Pierre and Marie were awarded the Davy Medal of the Royal Society of London. In the same year, Pierre and Marie Curie, as well as Henri Becquerel, were awarded a Nobel Prize in physics for their research of radioactivity.

Curie and one of his students, Albert Laborde, made the first discovery of nuclear energy, by identifying the continuous emission of heat from radium particles. Curie also investigated the radiation emissions of radioactive substances, and through the use of magnetic fields was able to show that some of the emissions were positively charged, some were negative and some were neutral. These correspond to alpha, beta and gamma radiation.

Spiritualism 
In the late nineteenth century, Pierre Curie was investigating the mysteries of ordinary magnetism when he became aware of the spiritualist experiments of other European scientists, such as Charles Richet and Camille Flammarion. Pierre Curie initially thought the systematic investigation into the paranormal could help with some unanswered questions about magnetism. He wrote to Marie, then his fiancée:  "I must admit that those spiritual phenomena intensely interest me. I think they are questions that deal with physics." Pierre Curie's notebooks from this period show he read many books on spiritualism. He did not attend séances such as those of Eusapia Palladino in Paris in June 1905 as a mere spectator, and his goal certainly was not to communicate with spirits. He saw the séances as scientific experiments, tried to monitor different parameters, and took detailed notes of every observation. Despite studying spiritualism, Curie was an atheist.

Family 
Pierre Curie's grandfather, Paul Curie (1799–1853), a doctor of medicine, was a committed Malthusian humanist and married Augustine Hofer, daughter of Jean Hofer and great-granddaughter of Jean-Henri Dollfus, great industrialists from Mulhouse in the second half of the 18th century and the first part of the 19th century.
Through this paternal grandmother, Pierre Curie is also a direct descendant of the Basel scientist and mathematician Jean Bernoulli (1667–1748), as is Pierre-Gilles de Gennes, winner of the 1991 Nobel Prize in Physics.

Pierre and Marie Curie's daughter, Irène, and their son-in-law, Frédéric Joliot-Curie, were also physicists involved in the study of radioactivity, and each also received Nobel prizes for their work. The Curies' other daughter, Ève, wrote a noted biography of her mother. She was the only member of the Curie family to not become a physicist.  Ève married Henry Richardson Labouisse, Jr., who received a Nobel Peace Prize on behalf of Unicef in 1965. Pierre and Marie Curie's granddaughter, Hélène Langevin-Joliot, is a professor of nuclear physics at the University of Paris, and their grandson, Pierre Joliot, who was named after Pierre Curie, is a noted biochemist.

Death 
Pierre Curie died in a street accident in Paris on 19 April 1906. Crossing the busy Rue Dauphine in the rain at the Quai de Conti, he slipped and fell under a heavy horse-drawn cart. One of the wheels ran over his head, fracturing his skull and killing him instantly. Statements made by his father and lab assistant imply that Curie's characteristic absent-minded preoccupation with his thoughts contributed to his death.

Both the Curies experienced radium burns, both accidentally and voluntarily, and were exposed to extensive doses of radiation while conducting their research. They experienced radiation sickness and Marie Curie died from radiation-induced aplastic anemia in 1934. Even now, all their papers from the 1890s, even her cookbooks, are too dangerous to touch. Their laboratory books are kept in special lead boxes and people who want to see them have to wear protective clothing. Most of these items can be found at Bibliothèque nationale de France. Had Pierre Curie not been killed as he was, it is likely that he would have eventually died of the effects of radiation, as did his wife, their daughter Irène, and her husband Frédéric Joliot.

In April 1995, Pierre and Marie Curie were moved from their original resting place, a family cemetery, and enshrined in the crypt of the Panthéon in Paris.

Awards 
Nobel Prize in Physics, with Marie Curie and Henri Becquerel (1903)
Davy Medal, with Marie Curie (1903)
Matteucci Medal, with Marie Curie (1904)
Elliott Cresson Medal (1909) awarded posthumously during Marie Curie's award ceremony
 Citation for Chemical Breakthrough Award from the Division of History of Chemistry of the American Chemical Society (2015)

Notes

References

External links 

 NobelPrize.org: History of Pierre and Marie
 Pierre Curie's Nobel prize
  including the Nobel Lecture, 6 June 1905 Radioactive Substances, Especially Radium
 Biography American Institute of Physics 
 Annotated bibliography for Pierre Curie from the Alsos Digital Library for Nuclear Issues Alsos Digital Library closure
 Curie's publication in French Academy of Sciences papers

French atheists
French nuclear physicists
1859 births
1906 deaths
Pierre
Discoverers of chemical elements
French Nobel laureates
Nobel laureates in Physics
Members of the French Academy of Sciences
University of Paris alumni
Academic staff of the University of Paris
Légion d'honneur refusals
Burials at the Panthéon, Paris
Pedestrian road incident deaths
Road incident deaths in France
Scientists from Paris
19th-century French chemists
19th-century French physicists
20th-century French physicists
Victims of radiological poisoning
 
Recipients of the Matteucci Medal